William Bethel Thompson (28 December 1906 – 12 February 1945) was an Australian racing driver. From Summer Hill, Sydney, he was active in motor sport from 1928 to 1936. His competition cars included various Bugattis, a Riley Brooklands and an MG K3. Although his career was not taken to the international level, he met with considerable successful in Australia, winning the Australian Grand Prix three times.

Thompson died as a result of an aircraft accident on 12 February 1945 in the Marshall Islands, Pacific Ocean. At the time of the accident, Thompson was serving in the Royal Australian Air Force and was travelling as an unauthorised passenger in a Consolidated PB2Y Coronado of the United States Navy.

Career results

References

Australian racing drivers
1906 births
1945 deaths
Royal Australian Air Force personnel of World War II
Royal Australian Air Force officers
Australian military personnel killed in World War II
Grand Prix drivers